OpenStage Theatre & Company, Inc. is a theatre company in northern Colorado.

Formation
It is governed by a Board of Directors, administered by a professional staff. 
Since its inception in 1973, OpenStage has actively produced and promoted live performing arts in Northern Colorado, making it one of the longest-practicing theatrical producers in the state. In addition to being the foremost local producer at the Fort Collins Lincoln Center, the city's primary performance space, OpenStage is a figure in the statewide arts producing community.

Work
OpenStage Theatre produces a season of six productions, each performing for five weeks.

References

Organizations based in Fort Collins, Colorado
Theatre companies in Colorado
Theatre in Colorado
Culture of Fort Collins, Colorado